Koiluoto (Cyrill. ) is an island in the Bay of Virolahti of the Gulf of Finland. It is divided by the border between Russia and Finland.

On both sides, the island is part of the border zone and is off-limits to the general public.

References 

Uninhabited islands of Finland
Uninhabited islands of Russia
International islands
Finland–Russia border